307 is a year in the common era (AD or CE)

307 may also refer to:

 307 BC
 307 (number)
 Peugeot 307, an automobile
 British Rail Class 307 locomotive
 Boeing 307 Stratoliner airliner
 .307 Winchester Cartridge
 Area code 307
 HTTP 307, status code for Temporary Redirect